Martin Jicha (born 15 August 1990 in the Czech Republic) is a Czech footballer who plays for FSC Stará Říše in his home country.

Career

Jicha started his senior career with Sellier & Bellot Vlašim in the Czech National Football League, where he made four league appearances and scored zero goals. After that, he played for UB Conquense and CSM Ceahlăul Piatra Neamț in the Romanian Liga I, where he made one league appearance and scored zero goals.

References

External links 
 
 
 menovec házenkáře Jíchy chytá divizi: Ptají se mě na Barcelonu 
 
 

Living people
1990 births
Czech footballers
Association football goalkeepers
Expatriate footballers in Romania
Liga I players
CSM Ceahlăul Piatra Neamț players